HD 98219 is a subgiant star in the constellation Crater.  It has a confirmed exoplanet. At around 4 billion years old, it is a star around 1.3 times as massive as the Sun that has cooled and expanded to 4.5 times the Sun's diameter, brightening to be around 11 times as luminous. The International Astronomical Union (IAU) gave the opportunity to Honduras to name the star Hunahpú as part of NameExoWorlds. Hunahpú was one of the twin gods who became the Sun in K'iche' (Quiché) Mayan mythology.

Planetary system
A gas giant planet with a minimum mass almost double that of Jupiter was discovered as part of a radial velocity survey of subgiant stars at Keck Observatory. The International Astronomical Union (IAU) has named it Ixbalanqué, the twin brother of Hunahpú.

References

Crater (constellation)
Planetary systems with one confirmed planet
Durchmusterung objects
098219
55174
K-type subgiants